Blue Anchor may refer to:

Places
Blue Anchor, Cornwall, England
Blue Anchor, West Somerset, England
Blue Anchor railway station
Blue Anchor, New Jersey, United States
Blue Anchor, Swansea, Wales

Other uses
Blue Anchor Building (California, USA)
The Blue Anchor Inn, pub in Aberthaw, Wales
Blue Anchor, Hammersmith, pub in London
The Blue Anchor, St Albans, former pub in St Albans

See also
Blue Anchor to Lilstock Coast SSSI (England)
Anchor Blue Clothing Company